A mixed criticality system is a system containing computer hardware and software that can execute several applications of different criticality, such as safety-critical and non-safety critical, or of different Safety Integrity Level (SIL). Different criticality applications are engineered to different levels of assurance, with high criticality applications being the most costly to design and verify. These kinds of systems are typically embedded in a machine such as an aircraft whose safety must be ensured.

Principle
Traditional safety-critical systems had to be tested and certified in their entirety to show that they were safe to use. However, many such systems are composed of a mixture of safety-critical and non-critical parts, as for example when an aircraft contains a passenger entertainment system that is isolated from the safety-critical flight systems. Some issues to address in mixed criticality systems include real-time behaviour, memory isolation, data and control coupling.

Computer scientists have developed techniques for handling systems which thus have mixed criticality, but there are many challenges remaining especially for multi-core hardware.

Priority and Criticality 
Basically, most errors are currently committed when making confusion between priority attribution and criticality management. As priority defines an order between different tasks or messages to be transmitted inside a system, criticality defines classes of messages which can have different parameters depending on the current use case. For example, in case of car crash avoidance or obstacle anticipation, camera sensors can suddenly emit messages more often, and so create an overload in the system. That is when we need to make Mixed-Criticality operate : to select messages to absolutely guarantee on the system in these overload cases.

Research projects
EU funded research projects on mixed criticality include:
 MultiPARTES
 DREAMS
 PROXIMA
 CONTREX
 SAFURE
 CERTAINTY
 VIRTICAL
 T-CREST
 PROARTIS
 ACROSS (Artemis)
 EMC2 (Artemis)
 RECOMP Artemis
 ARAMIS  and ARAMIS II
 IMPReSS

UK EPSRC funded research projects on mixed criticality include:
 MCC

Several research projects have decided to present their research results at the EU-funded Mixed-Criticality Forum

Workshops and Seminars
Workshops and seminars on Mixed Criticality Systems include:
 1st International Workshop on Mixed Criticality Systems (WMC 2013)
 2nd International Workshop on Mixed Criticality Systems (WMC 2014)
 3rd International Workshop on Mixed Criticality Systems (WMC 2015)
 4th International Workshop on Mixed Criticality Systems (WMC 2015)
 Dagstuhl Seminar on Mixed Criticality on Multicore/Manycore Platforms (2015)
 Dagstuhl Seminar on Mixed Criticality on Multicore/Manycore Platforms (2017)

References

External links
 Karlsruhe Institute of Technology: Mixed Criticality in Safety-Critical Systems
 Washington University in St Louis: A Research Agenda for Mixed-Criticality Systems

Software engineering
Safety engineering